The ECAC Lacrosse League was an American NCAA Division I college athletic conference and part of the Eastern College Athletic Conference. Founded in 1999 with play beginning in 2000, this part of the conference only sponsored men's lacrosse. It disbanded at the end of the 2014 season as an indirect result of the early-2010s NCAA conference realignment.

History
The founding members included Georgetown University, Pennsylvania State University (Penn State), Rutgers University, Stony Brook University, the University of Massachusetts Amherst, and the United States Naval Academy.  In 2005, Loyola College in Maryland, Hobart College, and St. John’s University joined the ECAC. And in 2006, Fairfield University joined the league.  In 2010, the league added Air Force, Bellarmine, Denver, Ohio State and Quinnipiac, replacing Georgetown, Rutgers and St. John's, who left for the original Big East Conference, and Massachusetts and Penn State, who left for the Colonial Athletic Association. In 2011, the ECAC added the University of Michigan Wolverines who were making their move from club level to NCAA Division I. They became full members in 2013, the same year in which Loyola's lacrosse team joined the rest of the school's sports in the Patriot League.

After the 2013 season, a number of members announced their intention to exit the ECAC.  In late May, following a second semi-finals appearance in three years, Denver announced that they would leave the ECAC to join the new Big East Conference for the 2014 season, leaving the ECAC with six teams for that season.  In early June, the Big Ten Conference announced the start of conference competition in 2015, removing Michigan and Ohio State from the ECAC after the 2014 season.  In mid-June, Fairfield announced it would join the Colonial Athletic Association for the 2015 season. On July 1st, Hobart announced it would join the Northeast Conference beginning immediately for the 2014 season.  One week later, Bellarmine announced it would become an affiliate of the ASUN Conference (then known as the Atlantic Sun Conference) for the 2015 season, leaving Air Force as the only ECAC school without a new conference home for 2015. Before Bellarmine's move took effect, the ASUN and Southern Conference (SoCon) announced a lacrosse alliance under which the two leagues split sponsorship of the sport, with women's lacrosse remaining in the ASUN and men's lacrosse shifting to the SoCon. Accordingly, Bellarmine played in the SoCon from the 2015 season until the ASUN established its own men's lacrosse league for the 2022 season.

Final members

Previous members

Membership timeline

Champions

Regular Season Champions

Playoff Champions

ECAC teams in the NCAA Tournament

Awards

All-time ECAC season statistic leaders
 Points: Sean Morris, Massachusetts (31, 2005)
 Points per game: Steve Dusseau, Georgetown (5.40, 2002)
 Goals: Scott Urick, Georgetown (21, 2000)
 Goals per game: Steve Dusseau, Georgetown (3.6, 2002)
 Assists: Brendan Cannon, Georgetown (18, 2006)
 Assists per game: Brendan Cannon, Georgetown (2.57, 2002)
 Saves: Drew Adams, Penn State (87, 2006)
 Goals against average: Mickey Jarboe, Navy (5.96, 2000)

See also
 ECAC Division II Lacrosse League

References

College lacrosse leagues in the United States
Defunct NCAA Division I conferences
Sports leagues established in 1999
Sports leagues disestablished in 2014
1999 establishments in the United States
2014 disestablishments in Massachusetts
Articles which contain graphical timelines